Ippolito Ippoliti (April 2, 1921 in Rome - November 30, 1966 Rome) was an Italian professional football player.

He played for 2 seasons (16 games) in the Serie A for A.S. Roma.

External links

1921 births
1966 deaths
Italian footballers
Serie A players
A.S. Roma players
Footballers from Rome
Association football goalkeepers